Richard Duffield (fl. 1413–1435), of Barton-upon-Humber, Lincolnshire, was an English politician.

He was a Member (MP) of the Parliament of England for Great Grimsby in
May 1413, November 1414, 1420, December 1421, 1422, 1423, 1425, 1426, 1431, 1432, 1433 and 1435.

References

14th-century births
15th-century deaths
English MPs May 1413
People from Barton-upon-Humber
English MPs November 1414
English MPs 1420
English MPs December 1421
English MPs 1422
English MPs 1423
English MPs 1425
English MPs 1426
English MPs 1431
English MPs 1433
English MPs 1435
Members of the Parliament of England for Great Grimsby